Henry Poole (c. 1592 – c. 1652) was an English politician who sat in the House of Commons variously between 1624 and 1640.

Biography 

Poole was the son of Sir Henry Poole of Sapperton, Gloucestershire, former MP for Gloucestershire, and his wife Anne Wroughton, daughter of Sir William Wroughton of Broad Hinton, Wiltshire. He matriculated at Merton College, Oxford on 10 July 1607 and was a student of the Middle Temple in 1609. In 1615 he purchased the manor of Cirencester from the Earl of Danby. He was Deputy Lieutenant for Gloucestershire in 1624.

In 1624 Poole was elected Member of Parliament for Cirencester, and was re-elected in 1625. In April 1640, he was re-elected MP for Cirencester in the Short Parliament. In 1645 his son William was compounded for delinquency and in 1647 was fined £1494. The Pooles had argued that father and son were forced to comply with the Royalist party and had never acted against parliament.  
 
Poole died before February 1652.

Family 

Poole married Hon. Beatrix Brydges daughter of William Brydges, 4th Baron Chandos and had three children, William, Anne and Beatrice (Beata). Anne married James Livingston, 1st Earl of Newburgh, and Beatrice married Thomas Pope, 3rd Earl of Downe.

References

1590s births
1650s deaths
Alumni of Merton College, Oxford
English MPs 1624–1625
English MPs 1625
English MPs 1640 (April)